Vetea Angelo Tchen (born 8 March 1982) is a Tahitian footballer who plays as a defender. He currently plays for Tefana in the Tahiti Division Fédérale and the Tahiti national football team.

In October 2013 he was appointed a knight of the Order of Tahiti Nui.

International goals

Honours
OFC Nations Cup:
 Winner (1): 2012

References

1982 births
Living people
French Polynesian footballers
Tahitian beach soccer players
Tahiti international footballers
French Polynesian people of Chinese descent
Association football defenders
2000 OFC Nations Cup players
2002 OFC Nations Cup players
2004 OFC Nations Cup players
2012 OFC Nations Cup players
Recipients of the Order of Tahiti Nui